Denver Earl Butler Sr. (December 31, 1938 – December 29, 2009) was an American politician and a Democrat member of the Kentucky House of Representatives representing District 38 from January 1989 until January 2007.

Elections
1988 Butler was initially elected in the 1988 Democratic Primary and November 8, 1988, General election, and re-elected in the general elections of November 6, 1990, and November 3, 1992.
1994 Butler was unopposed for both the 1994 Democratic Primary and the November 8, 1994 General election.
1996 Butler was unopposed for both the 1996 Democratic Primary and the November 5, 1996 General election.
1998 Butler was unopposed for the 1998 Democratic Primary and won the November 3, 1998 General election against Republican nominee Robert Wood.
2000 Butler was unopposed for the 2000 Democratic Primary and won the November 7, 2000 General election with 8,757 votes (70.0%) against Republican nominee Rondell Birge.
2002 Butler was challenged in the 2002 Democratic Primary, winning with 2,456 votes (74.0%) and was unopposed for the November 5, 2002 General election, winning with 7,496 votes.
2004 Butler was unopposed for the 2004 Democratic Primary and won the November 2, 2004 General election with 8,508 votes (58.8%) against Republican nominee Paul Hosse.

References

Democratic Party members of the Kentucky House of Representatives
People from Breckinridge County, Kentucky
1938 births
2009 deaths